Erdeslau or Ardeslawe is the old name for:

East Ardsley, Leeds, West Yorkshire, England.
West Ardsley, Leeds, West Yorkshire, England.